The 1991–92 Alabama Crimson Tide men's basketball team represented the University of Alabama in the 1991–92 NCAA Division I men's basketball season. The team's head coach was Wimp Sanderson, who was in his 12th season at Alabama. The team played their home games at Coleman Coliseum in Tuscaloosa, Alabama. They finished the season with a record of 26–9.  The team's conference record was 10–6, which was good enough for third place in the SEC Western Division, third behind new SEC member Arkansas and LSU.  This was the first season of divisional play in the SEC, due to the addition of new teams Arkansas and South Carolina.

Forward Melvin Cheatum and guard Gary Waites both graduated, and the Tide's freshman signees were center Cedric Moore, forwards Jason Caffey and Andre Perry, and guards Dennis Miller and Elliot Washington.  These players joined a solid core of Robert Horry, Latrell Sprewell, and James "Hollywood" Robinson.

This was coach Wimp Sanderson's final season as coach of the Crimson Tide.  Sanderson resigned amid sexual assault allegations from his former secretary.

The Tide advanced all the way to the 1992 SEC men's basketball tournament final, their fourth straight, but lost in the final to Kentucky.  The Tide received an at-large bid to the 1992 NCAA tournament and defeated Stanford in the first round, but lost to North Carolina in the second round.

Roster

References 

Alabama
Alabama Crimson Tide men's basketball seasons
Alabama Crimson Tide
Alabama Crimson Tide
Alabama